This is a list of years in Republic of the Congo.

20th century

21st century

 
 
Republic of the Congo history-related lists
Republic of the Congo